Gadarene Ridge is a ridge extending southward from Ship Cone in the Allan Hills of Victoria Land, Antarctica. It was reconnoitered by the New Zealand Antarctic Research Program Allan Hills Expedition (1964) who gave the name, with reference to the Gadarene swine of the Bible, because of the swine-backed appearance of the feature in profile.

References

Ridges of Oates Land